"Ethiopia, Be Happy" was the national anthem of the Ethiopian Empire during the rule of Emperor Haile Selassie I. Composed by Kevork Nalbandian in 1926, the anthem was first performed during the coronation of the Emperor on 2 November 1930. It remained the national anthem until the Emperor was overthrown by the Derg regime in 1974 and was relinquished the next year.

Lyrics

References 

1926 songs
Ethiopian songs
Historical national anthems
National symbols of Eritrea
National symbols of Ethiopia
Royal anthems